The chairman of the Standing Committee of the Supreme People's Assembly of the Democratic People's Republic of Korea, formerly known as the president of the Presidium of the Supreme People's Assembly of the Democratic People's Republic of Korea, is the presiding officer of the Standing Committee of the Supreme People's Assembly, which is the highest institution of state power in North Korea when the Supreme People's Assembly is not in session. The current chairman of the Standing Committee is Choe Ryong-hae, who was elected on 11 April 2019.

History
The 1948 Constitution created the position of Chairman of the Standing Committee of the Supreme People's Assembly. The chairman presided over the Standing Committee of the Supreme People's Assembly, which was given the power to ratify or annul treaties with foreign countries, appoint or recall ambassadors to foreign countries and receive letters of credentials or recall of foreign diplomatic representatives. This made the chairman of the SPA Standing Committee the de jure head of state of North Korea. Nominally, the Chairman of the SPA Standing Committee held the highest state post followed by the premier, Kim Il-sung.

The 1972 Constitution created the position of President of North Korea who is tasked with being the country's head of state. The Chairman of the Standing Committee of the Supreme People's Assembly (under the new Korean title of 최고인민회의 상설회의 의장) was removed of its power to represent the state and was limited to doing legislative work as the concurrent chairman of the Supreme People's Assembly.

The 1998 revision of the 1972 Constitution created the position under the new English translation of President of the Presidium of the Supreme People's Assembly with its powers as head of state restored. However, the 1972 Constitution was revised in April 2019 to designate the then-Chairman of the State Affairs Commission as the head of state, with the powers reserved to the head of state being transferred to the SAC chairman in August of the same year.

In February 2022, the Chairman of the State Affairs Commission began to be referred in English as the President of the State Affairs. This led to the President of the Presidium of the Supreme People's Assembly being referred in English to its previous title of Chairman of the Standing Committee of the Supreme People's Assembly.

Duties and responsibilities
According to the North Korean constitution, the chairman presides the Standing Committee of the Supreme People's Assembly and represents the state in receiving the letters of credentials and recall of foreign diplomatic representatives.

List of office holders

References

Citations

Sources 
 Works cited

 

Supreme People's Assembly
Parliamentary titles